The Drama Desk Award for Unique Theatrical Experience is an annual award presented by Drama Desk in recognition of achievements in the theatre among Broadway, Off Broadway and Off-Off Broadway productions. Due to their unusual nature, these productions cannot be categorized in the regular musical and play categories.

Winners and nominees

1970s

1980s

1990s

2000s

2010s

2020s

See also
 Laurence Olivier Award for Best Entertainment
 Tony Award for Best Special Theatrical Event

References

External links
 Drama Desk official website

Unique Theatrical Experience